Brighton is a civil parish in Carleton County, New Brunswick, Canada, northeast of Woodstock, extending from the eastern bank of the Saint John River to the York County line. It comprised (before 2023) one town and two local service districts, all of which are members of the Western Valley Regional Service Commission (WVRSC).

The Census subdivision of Brighton Parish included all of the civil parish except the town of Hartland.

Origin of name
The origin of the parish's name is not certain.

History
Brighton was erected in 1830 within York County from all of Wakefield Parish east of the channel of the Saint John River. It contained parts of modern Bright, Northampton, Peel, and Southampton Parishes.

Boundaries
Brighton Parish is bounded:

 on the west by the Saint John River;
 on the northwest by the prolongation of the north line of a land grant north of Hales Brook to the Cold Stream, then upstream to the southern line of grants near the junction of Black Road and East Coldstream Road;
 on the north by the southern line of those grants prolonged east to the county line;
 on the east by York County;
 on the south by a line beginning north of Shaws Creek and running southeast nearly to the southern line of the grant that includes the mouth of Shaws Creek, then easterly along property and grant lines to the boundary of the Becaguimec Game Management Area, then easterly to the county line.

Evolution of boundaries
Brighton was erected with very different boundaries than it has today. The northeastern and southwestern boundaries of the parish were based on the 1786 northeastern boundary of Northampton, with Brighton's northeastern boundary parallel to Northampton's and starting opposite the Whitemarsh Creek. If the Pine Island named is actually the next island downriver of modern Pine Island (Sharps Island, formerly Indian Island) then Shaws Creek is in the right place to be the mentioned river.

In 1833 the county line of the newly erected Carleton County ran through Brighton Parish, leaving part of the parish in York County. The legislation that erected new parishes from the orphaned parts of Northampton and Woodstock Parishes did not mention Brighton Parish.

By 1841 the ambiguity of the boundary with Northampton Parish caused the parish line to be changed to run true east from the mouth of Shaws Creek to the county line, indicating that Brighton only extended as far as a prolongation of the Northampton Parish line. The new parish line ran south of its present course, cutting through modern Newburg. The northern boundary would also have been altered due to the existing wording of Brighton's boundaries, taking a large piece of Kent Parish that included the modern communities of Armond, East Coldstream, Esdraelon, Hemphill Corner, South Gordonsville, South Knowlesville, and Windsor.

In 1850 the presumptive changes in the northern and eastern boundaries were confirmed. All islands in the Saint John River were explicitly removed from the parish, changing the earlier boundary based on which side of the channel an island fell on.

In 1859 the northwestern part of the parish was erected as Peel Parish, with the Cold Stream forming the western boundary of the new parish.

In 1862 the boundary with Northampton was moved to its present location, transferring the area of Newburg Road and Cape Road to Northampton. Wording changes in 1896 and 1952 clarified the boundary but did not change it.

In 1863 a strip on the northern edge of Brighton including Hemphill Corner was included in the newly erected Aberdeen Parish.

Municipality
The town of Hartland stretches from the just north of the mouth of the Becaguimec Stream to Route 575.

Local service districts
Both LSDs assess for the basic LSD services of fire protection, police services, land use planning, emergency measures, and dog control.

Brighton Parish
The local service district of the parish of Brighton originally comprised all of the parish outside of Hartland.

The LSD was established on 23 November 1966 to assess for fire protection following the abolition of county municipalities under the new Municipalities Act. Community services were added on 20 December 1967 and first aid & ambulance services on 14 October 1970.

Today the LSD additionally assesses for community & recreation services. The taxing authority is 208.00 Brighton.

LSD advisory committee: Yes. Chair Brent Pearson sat on the WVRSC board in 2015, 2016, and in late 2017 as a replacement. New Chair Tina Pelkey has sat on the WVRSC board since July 2018.

Coldstream
The local service district of Coldstream comprises an irregular area around the community of Coldstream at the mouth of the Cold Stream.

The LSD was established on 14 October 1970 to add street lighting.

Today the LSD additionally assesses for both street lighting and community & recreation services. The taxing authority is 221.00 Coldstream.

LSD advisory committee: unknown

Communities
Communities at least partly within the parish; bold indicates an incorporated municipality

  Armond
  Ashland
 Bannon
 Briggs Corner
 Carlisle
  Cloverdale
  Coldstream
 East Brighton
 East Cloverdale
 East Coldstream
 Esdraelon
 Hale
  Hartland
 Howard Brook
 Jericho
 Lower Brighton
 Lower Windsor
 Mainstream
 McKenna
 Mountain View
 Pole Hill
 Shewan
 South Knowlesville
 Upper Brighton
 Windsor

Bodies of water
Bodies of water at least partly in the parish:

 Nashwaak River
  Saint John River
 Becaguimec Stream
 Cold Stream
 Nackawic Stream
 Ackers Creek
 Cross Creek
 Deep Creek
 Angle Hill Lake
 Doughboy Lake
 Little Doughboy Lakes
 Long Lake
 Malcolm Lake
 Mud Lake
 Silver Lake

Other notable places
Parks, historic sites, and other noteworthy places at least partly in the parish.
 Becaguimec Stream Protected Natural Area
 Becaguimec Wildlife Management Area
 East Cloverdale Protected Natural Area
 Golden Ridge Protected Natural Area
 Howard Brook Protected Natural Area
 Welch Brook Protected Natural Area

Demographics
Parish population total does not include former incorporated town of Hartland. Revised census figures based on the 2023 local governance reforms have not been released.

Population
Population trend

Language
Mother tongue (2016)

See also
List of parishes in New Brunswick

Notes

References

Parishes of Carleton County, New Brunswick
Local service districts of Carleton County, New Brunswick